Ernest Adams may refer to:

Ernest Adams (baker) (1892–1976), New Zealand baker, businessman and philanthropist
Ernest Adams, a New Zealand bakery and a brand of Goodman Fielder
Ernest Wilcox Adams, philosopher, brother of William Y. Adams (1927 – 2019)
Ernest W. Adams, founder in 1994 of the organization that became the International Game Developers Association.

See also
Ernie Adams (disambiguation)